The King of Mexico (Spanish:El rey de México) is a 1956 Mexican comedy film. It was written by Luis Alcoriza.

Plot
A local radio station decides to try out an experiment and offers the first homeless man that walks by the chance of becoming a millionaire for a day. The fortunate man, Pablo Rojas (Adalberto Martinez), sleeps with other homeless people on the floor of a shelter.  After living a day of luxury, he returns to the shelter to tell his friends that the life of a millionaire was not much different from their own: They ate, slept and worked whenever they wanted; the only difference was that the rich had ulcers.

Cast
 Adalberto Martínez - Pablo Rojas 
 Silvia Derbez - Toña
 Elda Peralta - Elda Negri
 José Gálvez - Raúl Olmedo
 Rafael Banquells - Actor en película
 Nicolás Rodríguez - Don Abraham
 Óscar Ortiz de Pinedo - Director de la editorial
 Antonio Bravo - Maître d'
 Conchita Gentil Arcos - Dueña de vitrina
 Carmen Fernett - Chela Santiesteban
 Enedina Díaz de León - Puestera de bebidas
 Omar Jasso - Amigo borracho de Pablo
 Guillermo Cramer - Amigo pordiosero de Pablo
 Julio Sotelo - Anunciador cabaret
 Jorge Mondragón		
 José Pardavé

References

External links
 

1956 films
1956 comedy films
1950s Spanish-language films
Films about homelessness
Mexican comedy films
Films directed by Rafael Baledón
1950s Mexican films
Mexican black-and-white films